The United Kingdom of Great Britain and Northern Ireland competed as Great Britain at the 1956 Winter Olympics in Cortina d'Ampezzo, Italy.

Alpine skiing

Men

Women

Bobsleigh

Cross-country skiing

Men

Men's 4 × 10 km relay

Figure skating

Men

Women

Pairs

Speed skating

Men

References
Official Olympic Reports
International Olympic Committee results database
 Olympic Winter Games 1956, full results by sports-reference.com

Nations at the 1956 Winter Olympics
1956
Winter Olympics
Winter sports in the United Kingdom